Kendrick James Farris (born July 2, 1986) is an Olympic weightlifter from the United States. He competed for the United States in the 85 kg weight class at the 2008 Summer Olympics where he placed 8th. Farris also participated in the 2012 Summer Olympics in London where he placed 10th. He was the silver medalist at the 2013 Summer Universiade and the Pan-American Champion in 2010. Farris is coached by Kyle Pierce.

In the 2016 Olympics, Farris finished 11th in the 94 kg weight class, with a 160 kg snatch and 197 kg clean and jerk.

Personal life
Born in Shreveport, Louisiana, Farris attended Louisiana State University in Shreveport. He is an American. He and his wife Katrina have two sons, Khalil and Kingsley. He has been vegan since late 2014.

See also
List of vegans
Patrik Baboumian
Carl Lewis
The Game Changers

References

External links

Kendrick Farris Official website 

Farris's Profile on NBC Olympics website 

American male weightlifters
Living people
1986 births
Olympic weightlifters of the United States
Weightlifters at the 2007 Pan American Games
Weightlifters at the 2008 Summer Olympics
Weightlifters at the 2011 Pan American Games
Weightlifters at the 2012 Summer Olympics
Weightlifters at the 2016 Summer Olympics
Weightlifters at the 2015 Pan American Games
African-American sportsmen
Pan American Games medalists in weightlifting
Pan American Games bronze medalists for the United States
Universiade medalists in weightlifting
Universiade silver medalists for the United States
Medalists at the 2013 Summer Universiade
Medalists at the 2011 Pan American Games
Medalists at the 2015 Pan American Games
Pan American Weightlifting Championships medalists
21st-century African-American sportspeople
20th-century African-American people